Hercules or Hercules furens (The Mad Hercules) is a fabula crepidata (Roman tragedy with Greek subject) of c. 1344 lines of verse written by Lucius Annaeus Seneca.

Characters
Juno, Sister and wife of Jupiter, and queen of heaven
chorus, Of Thebans
Amphitryon, Husband of Hercules' mother
Megara, Wife of Hercules and daughter of Creon
Lycus, Usurper of the throne of Thebes
Hercules, Son of Jupiter and Alcmena, but the reputed son of Amphitryon
Theseus, King of Athens and friend of Hercules

Plot
Lycus was exiled for his crimes by Creon the father-in-law of Hercules and king of Thebes. Hercules being at that time away in the underworld, where he had gone to seek out Cerberus as the final labour assigned him by Eurystheus through Juno's hatred. Here he found Theseus, who had made a descent into the regions of Pluto in company of Pirithous with the intention of carrying off Proserpine. Lycus seized his opportunity, and aided by conspirators, slayed Creon together with his two sons, and usurped the Kingdom of Thebes.

Act I
Juno vents her anger at the love affairs of Jupiter, his concubines and bastard offspring, and is very angry about the successes of Hercules, and so on his return from the underworld will be thrown by Juno into a state of mad frenzy.

The Chorus of Thebans beginning with a description of the dawn of day alludes to the customs of the times, condemning the pursuits and undertakings of the nobles. They reprove Hercules for his audacity in the attempting of his various labors, and finally extol and sigh for the tranquillity which is only to be found in leading a retired life.

Act II
Megara bewails the absence of Hercules, and complains of the violence and insolence of Lycus. Amphitryon pities the despondent state of Megara's mind, and tenders his consolation.

Lycus, having slain Creon and his sons, has established himself on the throne and governs the kingdom. He seeks to marry Megara, using every stratagem, and threatens violence in case she refuses.

Act III
Hercules asks for the pardon of Phoebus and the rest of the gods, that although having been commanded, he had dragged Cerberus from the underworld to the regions above.

Hercules having returned from the underworld with Theseus encounters Amphitryon who greets him and informs him about events. Hercules goes off to kill Lycus. Theseus provides Amphitryon with an account of the underworld and the deeds of Hercules.

The Chorus sings of the victory of Hercules gained in the underworld, and praises the hero.

Act IV
Hercules having returned after the slaughter of Lycus, as he is about to offer sacrifices to the gods whom he has invoked, becomes mad and under the influence of his madness, he kills his wife and children, and then falls into a deep sleep.

Act V
Hercules wakes, with his mind restored, and learns that he has killed his own children. He prepares to kill himself, but prevailed on, by the appeals of Amphitryon and Theseus, he refrains from suicide, and at the suggestion of Theseus, he starts for Athens, to undergo the ordeal of atonement for his mad acts.

References

Further reading
 Otto Zwierlein (ed.), Seneca Tragoedia  (Oxford: Clarendon Press: Oxford Classical Texts: 1986) 
 John G. Fitch Tragedies, Volume I: Hercules. Trojan Women. Phoenician Women. Medea. Phaedra (Cambridge, MA: Harvard University Press: Loeb Classical Library: 2002)

External links 
Latin text at Perseus Project
Latin text at the Internet Archive
Translation by Frank Justus.Miller (1917) at Theoi.com (also available at Wikisource)

Plays by Seneca the Younger
Heracles in fiction
Tragedy plays
Plays based on classical mythology